The Danube–Criș–Mureș–Tisa Euroregion (DMKT; ; ;  or ) is a euroregion located in Hungary, Romania and Serbia. It is named after four rivers: Danube, Criș, Mureș and Tisa.

Member regions 

Originally established in 1997, the Danube–Criș–Mureș–Tisa euroregion consists of 8 member regions (formerly 9):
Arad County, in Romania,
Bács-Kiskun County, in Hungary,
Békés County, in Hungary,
Caraș-Severin County, in Romania,
Csongrád-Csanád County, in Hungary,
Hunedoara County, in Romania,
Timiș County, in Romania,
Vojvodina, autonomous province in Serbia.

In 2004, the Jász-Nagykun-Szolnok County of Hungary has abandoned membership in this regional cooperation, thus after 2004, DKMT euroregion is composed of only 8 member regions.

Largest cities in DKMT 

List of largest cities in DKMT (with population figures):

Gallery

See also 
 List of euroregions

External links 
Danube-Kris-Mures-Tisa regional co-operation 
Tisa and DTD
 Council of Europe: euroregions

Banat
Bačka
Syrmia
Geography of Arad County
Geography of Caraș-Severin County
Geography of Hunedoara County
Geography of Timiș County
Geography of Vojvodina
Euroregions of Serbia
Euroregions of Hungary
Euroregions of Romania
Geography of Bács-Kiskun County